Everything Sucks is the third studio album by American rapper Princess Nokia. It was released on February 26, 2020, on the same day as their fourth studio album, Everything Is Beautiful. The album has been described as "a brash, ruthless and insistent collection" of songs. The album was preceded by the single, "Practice", described by Nokia as having "brought punk to hip-hop." The album received generally positive reviews from critics.

Production 
A press release revealed that the album was "written primarily over one cathartic week in NYC" and was recorded by Nokia with collaborator Chris Lare. The album features additional production from Tony Seltzer, Powers Pleasant, Adam Pallin, and Invisible Will.

Critical reception 

The album received generally favorable reviews from critics. At Metacritic, which assigns a normalized rating out of 100 to reviews from professional publications, the album received an average score of 74, based on 6 reviews. Reviewing the album on his YouTube channel, theneedledrop, Anthony Fantano compared it to its counterpart, Everything is Beautiful, saying "there's a lot of banger beats on this one; harder hooks, slightly more topical focus."

Track listing

Personnel 
 Princess Nokia – vocals
 Tyler Dopps – mixing
 Joe LaPorta – mastering
 Chris Lare – producer 
 Tony Seltzer – producer 
 Powers Pleasant – producer 
 Adam Pallin – producer 
 Invisible Will – producer

References 

2020 albums
Princess Nokia albums
Self-released albums
Albums produced by Adam Pallin